is a museum in Chūō-ku, Niigata, Japan. It is also called .

Access

Transit bus
There is a Niigata City Loop Bus stop ' ' near the museum.

There is another bus stop ' ', 8 minutes' walk away from the museum. Transit bus operated by Niigata Kotsu C70 (line: C7) runs from Niigata Station Bandai Exit.

Water Shuttle
 Shinanogawa Water Shuttle: MINATOPIA

See also
 Northern Culture Museum

References

External links
 MINATOPIA
 Minatopia - Niigata Pref. Official Travel Guide (multilingual)

Museums in Niigata Prefecture
Buildings and structures in Niigata (city)
Giyōfū architecture